Holigarna is a genus of trees in the subfamily Anacardioideae of the cashew and sumac family Anacardiaceae. They grow naturally in India, Bangladesh and Indo-China. This is a poisonous tree; if contacted, it would irritate skin chemically and result in irreversible skin damage. Smoke from burning this wood is dangerously disabling.

Species
The Plant List and Catalogue of Life recognise about 7 accepted species, while Plants of the world Online has 9 accepted species: 
 Holigarna albicans 
 Holigarna arnottiana 
 Holigarna beddomei 
 Holigarna caustica 
 Holigarna ferruginea 
 Holigarna grahamii 
 Holigarna helferi 
 Holigarna kurzii 
 Holigarna nigra

References

Anacardiaceae
Anacardiaceae genera